This page documents all the tornadoes that touched down in the United States in June and July, 2007. Tornadoes in the month of January are given with their Fujita Scale intensity while all tornadoes from February and on are given with their Enhanced Fujita Scale intensity. This is because the scale was changed on February 1 due to the National Weather Service implementing a more accurate way to classify tornadoes.

United States yearly total

Note: January tornadoes were rated using the old Fujita scale, but are included in the chart above by matching the F rating to the related EF scale rating.

June
There were 152 tornadoes were reported in the US in June, of which 128 were confirmed.

June 1 event

June 2 event

June 3 event

June 4 event

June 6 event

June 7 event

June 9 event

June 10 event

June 11 event

June 12 event

June 13 event

June 14 event

June 15 event

June 16 event

June 17 event

June 18 event

June 19 event

June 20 event

June 21 event

June 22 event

June 24 event

June 25 event

June 26 event

June 27 event

June 29 event

June 30 event

July
There were 55 tornadoes were reported in the U.S. in July, however 69 were confirmed.

July 2 event

July 3 event

July 5 event

July 6 event

July 7 event

July 9 event

July 10 event

July 11 event

July 12 event

July 13 event

July 14 event

July 15 event

July 16 event

July 17 event

July 18 event

July 19 event

July 21 event

July 22 event

July 23 event

July 24 event

July 25 event

July 26 event

See also
 Tornadoes of 2007
 List of United States tornadoes in May 2007
 List of United States tornadoes from August to September 2007

Notes

References

F3 tornadoes
Tornadoes of 2007
2007 natural disasters in the United States
2007